Randy Wiel (born 21 April 1951) is a Dutch former basketball player and coach. Standing at 1.95 m, he played as guard.

Born and raised on Curaçao, he worked as a police officer before moving to the United States to play college basketball with North Carolina. After four years, he started his professional career with BV Amstelveen in the Dutch Eredivisie. On 19 December 1979, Wiel scored a career-high 39 points against BV Groningen. From 1982 to 1985, Wiel played for Elmex Leiden.

He started his coaching career in 1988 as an assistant coach for North Carolina. He secured his first head coach position at North Carolina-Asheville Bulldogs in 1993. From 2002 to 2004, Wiel was a scout for the Los Angeles Lakers of the National Basketball Association (NBA).

From 2004 to 2013 he coached in the Eredivisie. He led EiffelTowers Den Bosch to two national championships, in 2007 and 2009.

References 

Dutch men's basketball players
Dutch basketball coaches
ZZ Leiden players
Heroes Den Bosch coaches
1951 births
Living people